Hello, My Name Is Cox is a 1955 West German crime comedy film directed by Georg Jacoby and starring Johannes Heesters, Claude Borelli and Kurt Meisel. It was shot at the Bavaria Studios in Munich and on location in Brussels and Antwerp.

Cast

References

Bibliography

External links
 

1955 films
1950s crime comedy films
German comedy thriller films
Films directed by Georg Jacoby
Films based on German novels
Films based on radio series
Films set in Belgium
German crime comedy films
1950s German-language films
West German films
1955 comedy films
German black-and-white films
1950s German films
Films shot in Brussels
Films shot in Antwerp
Films shot at Bavaria Studios